The Vienna Awards for Fashion and Lifestyle are dedicated to special achievements in Austrian fashion and fashion design. The awards were initiated by Marjan Firouz in 2009. Each year the ceremony constitutes a prestigious event in the center of Vienna, hosted by major television stars from Germany and Austria such as Sonya Kraus, with performances of up-coming singers such as Nevena Tsoneva. The winners of the international categories Style Icon and Global Citizen are invited to participate as honorary guests of the ceremony. There are also other stars coming to Vienna to participate.

Selection, campaign 
The winners are selected according to the structure developed by the Academy awards. The winners of the previous three years select the winner of this year. There are only exceptions for the categories Best Designer, Tribute to Fashion & Lifestyle, Best Model and Style Icon who are selected by a committee. 

Since 2011 the event is promoted every year with a theme campaign closely related to the city of Vienna and its history. In 2011, this fashion shooting was dedicated to the landmark Riesenrad and in 2012 to the beloved St. Stephen's Cathedral. In 2013, Emma Heming-Willis was invited to star as Empress Elisabeth of Austria. In 2014, Jerry Hall performed as a modern Queen of the Night from Mozarts  The Magic Flute.

Awards 2009–14

See also

 List of fashion awards

References 

Fashion awards
Austrian fashion
Culture in Vienna